Pristimantis philipi is a species of frog in the family Strabomantidae.
It is endemic to Ecuador.
Its natural habitat is tropical high-altitude grassland.

References

philipi
Endemic fauna of Ecuador
Amphibians of Ecuador
Amphibians of the Andes
Amphibians described in 1995
Taxonomy articles created by Polbot